Reginald "Reggie" Devan Langhorne (born April 7, 1963), is a former professional American football player. He played in the NFL for 9 seasons from 1985 to 1993, playing for the Cleveland Browns and the Indianapolis Colts during that time.

College
After graduating from Smithfield High School, Langhorne played collegiate football for four years at Elizabeth City State University, an NCAA Division II school.

Langhorne is a member of Omega Psi Phi fraternity.

NFL career
Langhorne was selected by the Cleveland Browns in the seventh round of the 1985 NFL Draft. He played the role of the slot receiver, splitting time with a stacked receiving corps of Webster Slaughter and Brian Brennan, and later Eric Metcalf. Langhorne had arguably his best season as a Brown in 1988, amassing 780 receiving yards and 7 touchdowns. He continued to amass decent numbers, and signed with the Colts in 1992. He made an immediate impact on the Colts, leading the team in receptions and receiving yards. During the 1993 season, he had the best year of his career, reaching 1,000 receiving yards for the first time to go along with 85 receptions. However, Langhorne was cut along with many other veterans after that season, or "all the guys making over a million." He had already prepared a letter of resignation anyway, stating that he needed a break from the game.  Langhorne has served as the President of the Eddie Johnson Memorial Foundation since 2003.

Chris Berman referred to him as "Foghorn" Langhorne.

After NFL
Reggie opened up a bar and grille in Newport News, VA which he later sold. He now resides in the Cleveland, Ohio area and is a sales and leasing professional at Serpentini Chevrolet in Westlake, while still a part of the NFL as an inspector on Sundays and a Sports Analyst for CBS WOIO Cleveland.

During the NFL season, Langhorne is a weekly panelist on the local television pre-game show "Tailgate 19", on Cleveland CBS affiliate WOIO.

References

External links
 Database Football

1963 births
Living people
Sportspeople from Suffolk, Virginia
American football wide receivers
Elizabeth City State Vikings football players
Cleveland Browns players
Indianapolis Colts players